The Wonder Dream Concert was an historic concert held on October 4, 1975, at the National Stadium in Kingston, Jamaica. The concert was headlined by Stevie Wonder who was joined on the bill by Bob Marley & The Wailers and his former bandmates Peter Tosh and Bunny Wailer. The concert is sometimes known as the Wailers Reunion Show, as it was only the second time the original Wailers had performed together since 1973 and the last time they ever would. (The original three Wailers also performed together at a concert with the Jackson Five in Kingston at the National Stadium on March 8, 1975.)

The concert was a benefit concert for the Jamaican Institute for the Blind and was opened by Third World. Harold Melvin & The Bluenotes were scheduled to play but did not show 

For Stevie Wonder's encore, Stevie called for Bob to join him on stage and they played "I Shot The Sheriff" and "Superstition" together. Another notable moment was the last performance of the original Wailers' first hit "Simmer Down", originally from 1964.

The tracks the Wailers played were (in this order):

 Rastaman Chant
 Nice Time
 Simmer Down
 One Love
 Dream Land
 Fighting Against Convictions
 Mark Of The Beast
 You Can't Blame The Youth
 Legalize It
 So Jah Seh
 No Woman, No Cry
 Jah Live

Stevie Wonder then sang with his band:

 Golden Lady / Too High
 You And I
 Too Shy To Say / As
 All In Love Is Fair
 Don't You Worry 'bout A Thing
 Drum Solo
 Boogie On Reggae Woman
 I Was Made to Love Her
 Earth Angel
 Ain't Too Proud to Beg / I Heard It Through the Grapevine / Uptight (Everything's Alright) / Respect / What'd I Say
 My Cherie Amour
 Fingertips
 You Haven't Done Nothin'
 Living for the City
 You Are the Sunshine of My Life

Then the aforementioned "I Shot The Sheriff" and "Superstition" were performed as Wonder's encore.

See also
List of reggae festivals
Reggae

Notes

Concerts
Reggae festivals in Jamaica
1975 in music
1975 in Jamaica
W